Americium(III) hydroxide is a radioactive inorganic compound with the chemical formula Am(OH)3. It consists of one americium atom and three hydroxide groups. It was first discovered in 1944, closely related to the Manhattan Project. However, these results were confidential and were only released to the public in 1945. It was the first isolated sample of americium, and the first americium compound discovered.

Properties 
Americium hydroxide is a pink solid which is sparingly soluble in water. Due to self-irradiation the crystal structure of 241Am(OH)3 decomposes within 4–6 months, while for curium(III) hydroxide 244Cm(OH)3 the same process takes less than a day.

Synthesis 
Americium metal can be converted to Am(OH)3 in a four step process. As described by the Oak Ridge National Laboratory, americium is added to hydrochloric acid, then neutralized using ammonium hydroxide (NH4OH). A saturated oxalic acid solution is added to the now neutralized solution. This causes large americium oxalate crystals to begin to grow. Once complete precipitation is achieved, oxalic acid is once again added, to attain a  slurry of americium oxalate and oxalic acid. The americium oxalate is then filtered out, washed with water, and is partially dried by allowing exposure to air.

Am + (COOH)2 → Am(COO)2

The americium oxalate is then added to a platinum combustion boat to undergo calcination. The americium oxalate is dried in a furnace and will begin to decompose at 350 °C. When decomposition begins to occur, the oxalate will turn into the desired black americium dioxide. To ensure no oxalate remains in the americium dioxide, the oven temperature is increased to and held at 800 °C then slowly allowed to cool to room temperature.

Am(COO)2 → AmO2

The americium dioxide is heated once more, to about 600 °C, in the presence of hydrogen, to produce americium(III) oxide.

2AmO2 + H2O → Am2O3 + O2 + H2

The final step involves the hydrolysis of the americium(III) oxide, to produce the final product, americium(III) hydroxide.

Am2O3 + 3H2O → 2Am(OH)3

Reactions 
When ozone is bubbled through a slurry of americium(III) hydroxide in 0.03 M potassium bicarbonate at 92 °C, hexagonal KAmO2CO3 (potassium dioxoamericium(V) carbonate) can be obtained. Potassium carbonate can also be used. The resulting KAmO2CO3 reacts with dilute acids to produce americium dioxide.

O3 +  Am(OH)3 + KHCO3 + H2O → KAmO2CO3 + 3H2O + O2

In a dilute base such as sodium hypochlorite, Am(OH)3 gets oxidised to Am(OH)4, which is black in solution. Further oxidation using ozone and sodium hydroxide can produce yellow hydroxy species of Am(VI).

See also 

 Curium(III) hydroxide
 Americium(III) oxide

References 

Americium compounds
Hydroxides